Konthagan Perungarai is a small village near Manamadurai Town [[Paramakudi taluk, Ramanathapuram District, Tamil Nadu|, India, Village principle occupation is agriculture. The village surrounding is approximately 2.5 km.1000 people live in the area. Students study at Paramakudi & Ramanathapuram &Parthibanur&Manamadurai & Sivagangai schools and colleges.

Villages in Ramanathapuram district